An organ concerto is an instrumental piece of music for a pipe organ soloist with an orchestra.

Organ Concerto may refer to:

 Organ concerto (Bach)
 Organ concertos, Op. 4 (Handel)
 Organ concertos, Op. 7 (Handel)
 Organ Concerto (Leifs)
 Organ Concerto (Poulenc)
 Organ Concerto (Rouse)
 Organ Concerto (Williamson)

See also